Yugoslavia competed at the 2000 Summer Paralympics in Sydney, Australia. The delegation consisted of six competitors: three track and field athletes, one sport shooter, one swimmer, and one table tennis player.

Medalists

See also 
 Yugoslavia at the 2000 Summer Olympics

References

Nations at the 2000 Summer Paralympics
2000
Paralympics